Adam Cummins (born 3 March 1993) is an English footballer who plays for Stirling Albion as a defender. Cummins has previously played for Motherwell, Dundee,  Ayr United, Queen's Park, Bangor City and Stranraer.

Career

Motherwell
Born in Liverpool and growing up as a Liverpool fan, Cummins joined Motherwell in July 2011 from Everton, and was immediately drafted into the Motherwell under-19 squad. His performances for the Under-19's led to him featuring from the start in friendlies for the Motherwell reserves.

Cummins made his first-team debut in a 1–0 win over Aberdeen on 17 March 2012, playing the full 90 minutes. He later got his first career goal in a 5–1 win away to Inverness Caley Thistle on 18 November 2012. On 4 December 2012, Cummins signed a -year contract extension, keeping him at Motherwell until Summer 2015. Cummins said signing a contract extension was an easy decision.

On 9 January 2014, Cummins joined Dundee on loan until the end of the season. After two months on the bench, on 25 March 2014, Cummins made his debut for the club, in a 1–0 win over Queen of the South, playing the full 90 minutes. On 20 November 2014, Cummins signed for Scottish League One club Ayr United on loan for 30 days.

On 27 February 2015, Cummins went out on loan again, this time to Stirling Albion for the remainder of the 2014–15 season. He made his debut in a 4–1 defeat against Airdrieonians on 28 February 2015. Cummins was released by Motherwell at the end of the 2014–15 season.

Bangor City
On 18 August 2015, Cummins signed for Welsh Premier League side Bangor City.

Cummins made his first team debut for Bangor City in a 1–1 draw against Rhyl on 21 August 2015, playing the full 90 minutes. He scored his first goal for the citizens in a 3–0 home win against Newtown on 24 August 2015.

Queen's Park
On 4 July 2016, Cummins signed for Scottish League One club Queen's Park.

Stranraer
Ahead of the 2018–19 season, Cummins moved to Stranraer.

Stirling Albion
Cummins signed for Stirling Albion in May 2021.

Career statistics

References

External links
 
 

1993 births
Living people
People from Maghull
Footballers from Liverpool
English footballers
Association football defenders
Everton F.C. players
Motherwell F.C. players
Dundee F.C. players
Ayr United F.C. players
Stirling Albion F.C. players
Bangor City F.C. players
Queen's Park F.C. players
Stranraer F.C. players
Scottish Premier League players
Scottish Professional Football League players
Cymru Premier players